Virginia's 39th Senate district is one of 40 districts in the Senate of Virginia. It has been represented by Democrat George Barker since his 2007 defeat of Republican incumbent Jay O'Brien.

Geography
District 39 covers parts of Alexandria, Fairfax County, and Prince William County in the suburbs of Washington D.C., including some or all of Rose Hill, Franconia, Newington, Lorton, Lake Ridge, and Buckhall.

The district overlaps with Virginia's 1st, 8th, 10th, and 11th congressional districts, and with the 13th, 39th, 40th, 42nd, 43rd, 46th, and 51st districts of the Virginia House of Delegates.

Recent election results

2019

2015

2011

Federal and statewide results in District 39

Historical results
All election results below took place prior to 2011 redistricting, and thus were under different district lines.

2007

2003

2002 special
As a result of redistricting prior to the 2003 elections, District 39 moved from Southwest Virginia to Northern Virginia, causing then-incumbent Madison Marye to resign and forcing a special election.

1999

1995

References

Virginia Senate districts
Government in Fairfax County, Virginia
Prince William County, Virginia
Alexandria, Virginia